The Progressive Republican Party (Portuguese: Partido Republicano Progressista, PRP) was a Brazilian political party.

It became a registered political party on 22 November 1991; its electoral number was 44.

On 17 December 2018, the PRP merged with Patriota, effectively dissolving the PRP.

References

External links
 PRP

1991 establishments in Brazil
Centrist parties in Brazil
Political parties established in 1991
Political parties disestablished in 2018
2018 disestablishments in Brazil
Political parties in Brazil
Defunct political parties in Brazil